The Selma Rosenwald School is a historic school building, just south of US Route 278 on the Selma-Collins Road in Selma, Arkansas.  Built in 1924 with funds provided by philanthropist Julius Rosenwald, it is the only surviving Rosenwald School in Drew County.  It is a single story wood-frame building with two classrooms.  The building was used as a school, serving grades 1 through 10, until 1964.  It was then acquired by the local Masonic Lodge.

The building was listed on the National Register of Historic Places in 2006.

See also
National Register of Historic Places listings in Drew County, Arkansas

References

School buildings on the National Register of Historic Places in Arkansas
School buildings completed in 1924
Buildings and structures in Drew County, Arkansas
National Register of Historic Places in Drew County, Arkansas
Historically segregated African-American schools in Arkansas
1924 establishments in Arkansas